Uragan-2M (U-2M) is a stellarator (magnetic plasma confinement, controlled thermonuclear fusion experiment) installed at the Institute of Plasma Physics National Science Center, which is part of the Kharkiv Institute of Physics and Technology (IFS KIPT) in Kharkiv, Ukraine. It was the largest stellarator (torsatron) in Europe until the construction of Wendelstein 7-X.

Specifications
Uragan-2M is a medium-sized stellarator with reduced helical corrugations.

See also 
 Controlled thermonuclear fusion

References

Further reading
 
 

Stellarators
Nuclear research institutes
Plasma physics facilities